Zinc finger BED-type containing 5 is a protein that in humans is encoded by the ZBED5 gene.

Function

This gene is unusual in that its coding sequence is mostly derived from Charlie-like DNA transposon; however, it does not appear to be an active DNA transposon as it is not flanked by terminal inverted repeats. The encoded protein is conserved among the mammalian Laurasiatheria branch. Multiple alternatively spliced variants, encoding the same protein, have been identified.

See also
BED zinc finger

References

Further reading